The 2019–20 Oakland Roots SC season was the club's first ever and its first in the newly created National Independent Soccer Association (NISA), a newly established third division soccer league in the United States.

Overview
Oakland Roots announced on June 27, 2019 that the team would apply to join NISA after previously announcing it would take part in the NPSL Members Cup. a tournament put on by the National Premier Soccer League as a precursor to a proposed professional league in 2020. In August, the team was announced into the league along with Detroit City FC and Chattanooga FC. Unlike the other two teams, the Roots were announced as part of the Fall season and took part as members of the West Coast Conference.

On December 11, NISA announced the Oakland, Detroit, Chattanooga, and Michigan Stars FC had all been approved by the U.S. Soccer Board of Directors.

Paul Bravo was announced as the Roots' first head coach on May 9, 2019. On October 31, following the fall season, the club announced they and Bravo had mutually parted ways. Assistant coach Jordan Ferrell was named as interim head coach and later, on December 3, officially named as the new head coach. The team won its first NISA match on March 7, 2020, 2–1, at home against Michigan Stars FC.

The team played two friendly matches against Mexican professional teams early in the season, falling to Liga MX side FC Juárez in early September and beating second division side Club Atlético Zacatepec with both games selling out.

On April 27, 2020, following a stoppage of play and subsequent extension due to the COVID-19 pandemic, NISA announced the cancellation of the 2020 Spring season.

Roster

Players

Staff
  Jordan Ferrell – Head coach
  Dario Pot – Assistant coach
  Yuta Tanaka – Strength and conditioning coach

Transfers

In

Out

Friendlies

Competitions

NISA Fall season (Showcase)

Standings

Results summary

Matches

NISA Spring Season 

Details for the 2020 NISA Spring season were announced January 27, 2020.

Standings

Results summary

Matches

U.S. Open Cup 

Oakland will enter the 2020 U.S. Open Cup with the rest of the National Independent Soccer Association teams in the Second Round. It was announced on 29 January that their first opponent would be USL Championship side Sacramento Republic FC.

Squad statistics

Appearances and goals 

|-
! colspan="16" style="background:#dcdcdc; text-align:center"| Goalkeepers

|-
! colspan="16" style="background:#dcdcdc; text-align:center"| Defenders

|-
! colspan="16" style="background:#dcdcdc; text-align:center"| Midfielders

|-
! colspan="16" style="background:#dcdcdc; text-align:center"| Forwards

|-
! colspan="16" style="background:#dcdcdc; text-align:center"| Left during season

|-
|}

Goal scorers

Disciplinary record

Notes

References

External links 

 

2019
Oakland Roots
Oakland Roots
Oakland Roots
Oakland Roots